Mabel's Adventures is a 1912 American short silent comedy film starring Mabel Normand and produced and directed by Mack Sennett for the Mutual Film Corporation.

Cast
 Mabel Normand as Mabel
 Fred Mace as The Burlesque Queen
 Ford Sterling as The Magician

External links
 

1912 films
1912 comedy films
Silent American comedy films
American silent short films
American black-and-white films
Films directed by Mack Sennett
Keystone Studios films
1912 short films
American comedy short films
1910s American films